Maurice Manificat (born 4 April 1986) is a French cross-country skier who has competed since 2004.

Career
He has achieved three World Cup victories, in Lahti (March 2010), in Canmore (December 2012), both in the 15 km + 15 km double pursuit event, and in Davos (December 2017), in 15 km freestyle.

Manificat also finished 47th in the 15 km + 15 km double pursuit event at the FIS Nordic World Ski Championships 2009 in Liberec.

At the 2010 Winter Olympics in Vancouver, he finished fourth in the 4 x 10 km relay.

He won the bronze medals in the 4 x 10 km relay at the 2014 Winter Olympics in Sochi and the 2018 Winter Olympics in PyeongChang.

In the World Championship in Falun 2015, he won the silver medal in 15 km freestyle. Johan Olsson of Sweden won the race.

Cross-country skiing results
All results are sourced from the International Ski Federation (FIS).

Olympic Games
 4 medals – (4 bronze)

Distance reduced to 30 km due to weather conditions.

World Championships
 4 medals – (1 silver, 3 bronze)

World Cup

Season standings

Individual podiums
10 victories – (6 , 4 ) 
34 podiums – (17 , 17 )

Team podiums
 2 podiums – (2 )

References

External links
 

1986 births
Cross-country skiers at the 2010 Winter Olympics
Cross-country skiers at the 2014 Winter Olympics
Cross-country skiers at the 2018 Winter Olympics
Cross-country skiers at the 2022 Winter Olympics
French male cross-country skiers
Living people
Olympic cross-country skiers of France
Medalists at the 2014 Winter Olympics
Medalists at the 2018 Winter Olympics
Medalists at the 2022 Winter Olympics
Olympic bronze medalists for France
Olympic medalists in cross-country skiing
FIS Nordic World Ski Championships medalists in cross-country skiing
Tour de Ski skiers
Sportspeople from Haute-Savoie